SELENE-2 , or the Selenological and Engineering Explorer 2, is a cancelled Japanese robotic mission to the Moon that would have included an orbiter, a lander and a rover. It was intended as a successor to the 2007 SELENE (Kaguya) lunar orbiter.

Overview

The lander would have targeted lava tubes and other permanently shadowed areas, which function as cold trap volatiles such as water. Water ice could be processed by future missions to produce spacecraft propellant (LOX/H2).

Orbiter
The orbiter would have a mass of  700 kg.

Lander
The lander would have a mass of 1,000 kg, and would be able to deliver up to 340 kg of payload, including the rover. Its mission would last two weeks.

Rover
The rover would have a mass of 100 kg, and it would operate for two weeks.

Penetrators 
One option JAXA was investigating in 2006, was to integrate a small data relay satellite and penetrators into the mission.

References

External links 
 Manabu Kato, The Current Status of the Japanese Penetrator Mission Lunar-A, ISAS/JAXA,   Information about the penetrator tests.

Cancelled space probes
Missions to the Moon
Japanese Lunar Exploration Program
Lunar rovers
Robots of Japan
Japanese space probes